Wii Sports Resort is a 2009 sports simulation video game developed and published by Nintendo for the Wii video game console, and is the sequel to Wii Sports. It is one of the first Wii games to require the Wii MotionPlus accessory, which was bundled with the game. Wii Sports Resort was first announced at E3 2008 and was released in Japan on June 25, 2009 and in nearly all other regions in the following month. While Wii Sports Resort was originally released only as a stand-alone title, it was later bundled with newer Wii consoles alongside Wii Sports.

Wii Sports Resort received positive reviews from critics, with praise for the improved controls, gameplay, and graphics. As of March 31, 2021, the game is the third best-selling game on the Wii, after its predecessor Wii Sports and Mario Kart Wii, with 33.14 million copies sold worldwide  this puts it at eighteenth on the best selling video games ever. A sequel, Nintendo Switch Sports, was released April 29, 2022.

Gameplay
Wii Sports Resort is a sports video game set in a tropical resort on an archipelago named Wuhu Island. The first time a player starts the game, several instructional videos will play, then the strap usage screen and the Wii MotionPlus test, and finally, the player will skydive to Wuhu Island. Twelve different sports are available to play; like the original Wii Sports game, the sports are each played by holding the Wii Remote (and in some cases, the Nunchuk) in a manner similar to the actual sport being replicated.

Most notably, in archery, the player holds the Wii Remote vertically to hold the bow and pulls back the Nunchuk to pull back the bow's string. The new feature that Wii Sports Resort brings is Wii MotionPlus compatibility, which enables 1:1 control and allows the games to be played with greater accuracy. For example, the game's new variation, table tennis, gives the player greater control over adding spin to the ball by twisting the Wii Remote while swinging. In golf, the player can spin the ball by twisting the Wii Remote while swinging. Some sports involving more than two players support hotseat multiplayer, in which just one Wii Remote is needed and is shared among players while taking turns. The only sports in this game returning from the original Wii Sports are Bowling and Golf, while Table Tennis was originally a game in Wii Play. The other nine sports are completely new and original to the game.

List of sports

Some of these sports are one-player, and some of them have a different version of the sport that is two-player.  Most of the sports support multiplayer; in those sports, the maximum number of players is either two or four, depending on the sport.

Development

The idea for a sequel to Wii Sports was considered well before the advent of the Wii MotionPlus peripheral, but development only moved forward when the new possibilities in control were realized. The game was first revealed at Nintendo's E3 2008 press conference. A fishing minigame and a water slide minigame were originally considered for inclusion in the game, but were scrapped during development. A prototype kendama minigame was also created, but it was left out of the final game as the developers felt it did not fit into the resort theme.

Wuhu Island

The main setting of Wii Sports Resort, Wuhu Island, originally appeared at E3 2006 in the scrapped "Airplane" mode for Wii Sports, but was subsequently changed to fit the mold of the Wii Fit series as "Wii Fit Island" and to then be remolded again into the profile of a resort island, where it would earn its official name of Wuhu Island. Hotels, a castle, some rock formations and ruins of an older civilization,  and various sport arenas (such as the tennis courts from Wii Sports, a bowling alley, and a swordplay arena) were added. The island has since appeared as a stage in Nintendo games such as Wii Fit Plus (as well as its Wii U counterpart Wii Fit U), Pilotwings Resort, Mario Kart 7, Mario Kart 8 Deluxe, Super Smash Bros. for Wii U, and Super Smash Bros. Ultimate.

Wii Sports + Wii Sports Resort
In 2011, Nintendo released Wii Sports + Wii Sports Resort, which was the new pack-in game for Wii consoles, and was never sold individually. It later became the pack-in game for newer versions of the Wii Family Edition in late 2012.

Reception

Wii Sports Resort has received generally favorable reviews, with an average score on Metacritic of 80%. IGN gave it a 7.7 out of 10, citing the impressive fidelity of the controls and how the graphics, as compared to the majority of Wii games, were superb. GameTrailers gave an 8.6 out of 10. GameSpot gave it an 8.0 out of 10. Edge magazine gave it a 6 out of 10. On 1UP.com, the average score between the editors reviews and users was an 'A-.' GamesRelay gave the game a score of 8.2, citing it to be a fun loving game for family and friends. SPOnG.com's Tim Smith awarded the game 90%, calling Wii Sports Resort and the MotionPlus peripheral "simple but welcome additions to the Wii's line-up".

In May 2010 the American Heart Association (AHA) endorsed the Wii  to encourage sedentary people to take the first step toward fitness. The AHA heart icon covers the console itself along with two of its more active games, Wii Fit Plus and Wii Sports Resort. Nintendo Power listed Wii Sports Resort along with its predecessor Wii Sports as being two of the greatest multi-player experiences in Nintendo history, stating that everyone can have fun with them, ranging from young children to grandparents. They also cite the wide range of sports available.

Sales
In Japan, Wii Sports Resort sold 152,000 copies within its first day of release. and over 514,000 copies in two weeks. In North America it sold over 500,000 copies in its first week. By mid-July 2009, the game had sold over 2 million copies worldwide, with 600,000 copies sold in Europe and 828,000 sold in Japan. Nintendo announced that they had sold over one million units individually in the United States, Japan and Europe, accounting for over 3 million copies sold by August 2009.

In 2009, Wii Sports Resort sold 7.57 million copies, making it the second biggest selling game worldwide of that year. As of March 31, 2021, Wii Sports Resort has sold 33.14 million copies worldwide.

See also

Kinect Sports
Sports Champions
Wii Sports
Pilotwings Resort
Nintendo Switch Sports

Notes

References

External links
Official website

2009 video games
Basketball video games
Bowling video games
Golf video games
Multiplayer and single-player video games
Multiplayer hotseat games
Multiple-sport video games
Nintendo games
Nintendo Entertainment Analysis and Development games
Tennis video games
Touch! Generations
Video games developed in Japan
Video games set on fictional islands
Wii-only games
Wii MotionPlus games
Wii games
Pack-in video games
Table tennis video games
Video games scored by Ryo Nagamatsu
BAFTA winners (video games)